The Società Elettrica Sopracenerina, or Electricity Company of Sopraceneri, is a Swiss electricity supply company. It operates throughout the Sopraceneri region of the canton of Ticino, and is headquartered in the city of Locarno. It is part of the Alpiq Group.

References 

Companies based in Locarno
Electric power companies of Switzerland
Economy of Ticino